Hard Station is a 1981 album by Irish singer/songwriter Paul Brady, his second solo album.

Track listing
All tracks composed by Paul Brady
"Crazy Dreams"
"The Road to the Promised Land"
"Busted Loose"
"Cold Cold Night"
"Hard Station"
"Dancer in the Fire"
"Night Hunting Time"
"Nothing But the Same Old Story"

Personnel
Paul Brady
Jimmy Faulkner, Arty McGlynn - guitar
Tommy Moore - bass
Fran Breen - drums
Betsy Cook - keyboards, vocals

External links
 Hard Station on Amazon

1981 albums
Paul Brady albums